Premature is a 2019 American romantic drama film directed by Rashaad Ernesto Green and written by Green and Zora Howard. The film stars Howard and Joshua Boone. The plot follows a teenager who has a summer romance with an older man. It premiered at the 2019 Sundance Film Festival on January 26, 2019. Premature was released in theaters and on video on demand on February 21, 2020, by IFC Films.

Premise
IFC Films says in its official synopsis, "On a summer night in Harlem during her last months at home before starting college, seventeen-year-old poet Ayanna meets Isaiah, a charming music producer who has just moved to the city. It's not long before these two artistic souls are drawn together in a passionate summer romance. But as the highs of young love give way to jealousy, suspicion, and all-too-real consequences, Ayanna must confront the complexities of the adult world—whether she is ready or not."

Cast
 Zora Howard as Ayanna
 Joshua Boone as Isaiah
 Michelle Wilson
 Alexis Marie Wint
 Imani Lewis
 Tashiana Washington
 Myha'la Herrold as Dymond

Production
Zora Howard co-wrote the film with director Rashaad Ernesto Green. Premature is his second feature film. The director of photography is Laura Valladao.

Critical reception
The site's critics consensus reads: "Premature transcends its familiar trappings with sharp dialogue and a strong sense of setting that further establish Rashaad Ernesto Green as a gifted filmmaker."

In a review for TheWrap, Candice Frederick stated, "The push and pull of Ayanna and Isaiah's relationship comes off naturally, thanks to Howard and Green's sensitive writing. That style carries over to Laura Valladao's equally raw cinematography, capturing the hot New York City summer from the almost dusty sidewalk pavements, to the fiery sunset over the park, and the intimacy of two vulnerable lovers in bed at night next to an open window." Jon Frosch wrote of Howard's performance in a review for The Hollywood Reporter, "What keeps you invested is Howard, who makes her proud, steely character's every moment of vulnerability feel like a gift to both the audience and to Isaiah, who may not be worthy of her. It's a performance that builds gradually in power and radiance."

References

External links
 
 

2019 films
2010s coming-of-age drama films
2019 romantic drama films
African-American romantic drama films
American coming-of-age drama films
Coming-of-age romance films
Films set in New York City
Films shot in New York City
2010s English-language films
2010s American films
2019 independent films